Pavel Bazuk (born 27 May 1975) is a Belarusian weightlifter. He competed in the men's middle heavyweight event at the 2000 Summer Olympics.

References

1975 births
Living people
Belarusian male weightlifters
Olympic weightlifters of Belarus
Weightlifters at the 2000 Summer Olympics
Place of birth missing (living people)